Tang Chang (1 May 1934 – 26 August 1990) was a self-taught artist, poet, writer and philosopher of Sino-Thai heritage.

Biography 
He was born on 1 May 1934 to a poor, Chinese family in the area of the Somdet Chao Phraya Market, Thonburi, across the river from Bangkok. As a young boy, he studied at the Pitchaya Yatikaram Temple School, until the effects of World War II on his family’s financial situation forced him to end his education.

After Chang left school, he developed an interest in artistic expression and used found pieces of charcoal and chalk to draw on the streets and the walls of his home. With funds received from his work as a menial labourer, he bought paper, paint and pencils and with these began drawing portraits of his family members and neighbours. He continued this practice until he was able to open a stall at a local market to undertake portraits professionally. After that, Chang began painting watercolour landscapes of the areas around his house. In 1960, one of these paintings, a landscape featuring the house of Pratuang Emjaoren, a well-known Thai artist and a close friend of Chang’s, became the first of his works to be included in an exhibition.

In the late 1950s, Chang began producing the first of his gestural abstraction paintings for which he is best known. According to the artist, these paintings were the result of a series of experimentations undertaken with the aim of developing a style that reflected Buddhist and Daoist principles, while also offering an alternative to the cubistic and impressionistic works that dominated Thai art circles of the period. These works were exhibited for the first time in 1966 at the Pratumwan art gallery, but were not received favourably by Thai audiences.

In 1968, when the artist was 34 years old, he self-published a book featuring his ‘concrete poems,’ which dealt with social themes as well as more personal meditations on nature and family life. Unlike his paintings, these works garnered interest from Thai literary circles, gaining popularity within counterculture movements that were gaining traction in the late 1960s and early 1970s.

Throughout his career, Chang positioned himself outside of mainstream art circles dominated by Silpakorn University and its National Exhibition of Art. Instead, he preferred to hold exhibitions of his and his student’s works at his own home. Similarly, Chang generally refused to sell his works, preferring instead to gain income through other means. Chang died in August 1990 at the age of 56, and was survived by his wife, four sons and three daughters.

Arts Exhibition & Poetry

1960 
“The Thai-Chinese Art Exhibition of Thailand”, Bangkok.

1966 
“Contemporary Artists” Invitational Show", the 1st contemporary art exhibition initiated, organized and participated by leading contemporary artists, at Pathumwan Art Gallery, Bangkok.

1967 
“Thai Contemporary Art Exhibition”, Singapore.
“Thai Contemporary Art Exhibition” , Malaysia.
“Five Contemporary Artists”, the 3rd contemporary art exhibition, at Pathumwan Art Gallery, Bangkok.

1968 
“Tang Chang, his students and children” Art Exhibition, King Kaew Orphanage in Chiengmai province, a benefit show.
“Tang Chang and Children”s Art Exhibition”, Gallery 20, Bangkok.

1969 
“Invited Artist”, invited by the School of Art and Crafts (Poh Chang) to participate in its special exhibition of contemporary art, Bangkok.
“Tang Chang and Children”s Art Exhibition”, the 1st of its series ever staged at Tang Chang"s home in Bangkok.

1970 
“Tang Chang’s Paintings and Poetries Exhibition”, the 2nd of its series held at Tang Chang"s home, Bangkok.
“Tang Chang: His Art and Poetry”, a collection of his selected drawings, paintings and poetry (covering a full decade of accomplishments from 1960-1970), the 3rd of its series exhibited at Tang Chang"s home, Bangkok.
“An Introduction to Tang Chang: Poet, Artist and Philosopher”, a special exhibition on his contemporary drawings and paintings, poetry, and philosophical writings, at the Embassy of the United States of America, Wireless Road, Bangkok.

1971 
Art Exhibition “Tang Chang, his students and children’s poetry”, the 4th in the series held at his home in Bangkok.

1972 
“Tang Chang, His Students and Children”s Art Exhibition”, at the foyer of the Warners Theatre, Bangkok.
“Contemporary Poetry”, a public recital as invited poet at Kasetsart University, Bangkok.

1973 
“Tang Chang, His Students and Children”s Art Exhibition”, an open air contemporary art exhibition staged along the footpath around the huge Phramane Ground (Sanam Luang), next to the Royal Grand Palace and the Temple of the Emerald Buddha, Bangkok.

1974 
“Tang Chang and His Children”s Art Exhibition”, at Suan Kularb College, Bangkok.
“Tang Chang: His Art and Writings”, a special exhibit staged at the main auditorium of Thammasat University.
“Tang Chang and His Children”s Art Exhibition”, an Invitational show organized and sponsored by the Goethe Institute-Bangkok.

1980 
“Mother”, a public display of his writings, and poetry recital of his concrete poetry, sponsored by the Buddhism Studies Club, Thammasat University.
“Thai-Chinese-English Poetry Society of Thailand”, a special forum of cultural exchange through poetry written in 3 different languages, “Invited Poet” participating in public poetry recital, the National Library, Bangkok.
“Tang Chang: His Concrete Poetry”, an invitational show of his concrete poetry, reciting his works to the audience, at Silapakorn University.

1981 
“The 27th National Art Exhibition”, participated as an Invited Artist, Bangkok.

1985 
Poetry Recital, at the A.U.A. Auditorium, Bangkok. Establishment of Poet Tang Chang Institute of  Modern Art, Bangkok.
“Tang Chang”s Retrospective Show (1957-1985)”, at Poet Tang Chang Institute of Modern Art.

1991 
“The Power of Truth” By Tang Chang : Pratuang Emcharoen, at River City Shopping Complex, Bangkok

1994 
“Palette of Tang Chang’s Inner Mind” ,Solo Exhibition at Sukhumvit 20, Bangkok.

1995 
“Asian Modernism” 28th  Oct – 3rd  Dec. at Japan Foundation Forum, Tokyo, organized by The Japan Foundation Asia Center.

1996 
“Asian Modernism” 6th  Feb – 6 March. Metropolitan Museum of Manila, Philippines, organized by Metropolitan Museum of Manila, Embassy of Japan, The Philippines, The Japan Foundation.
“Asian Modernism” 8–28 May, at The National Gallery, Bangkok, Thailand, organized by The Fine Arts Department, Ministry of Education, Thailand and The Japan Foundation.
“Asian Modernism” 1 June – 31 July, Gedung Pameran Seni Rupa, Department Pendidkan dan Kebudayaan, Jakata, Indonesia, organized by Directorate General for Culture, Ministry of Education and Culture, Republic of Indonesia and The Japan Foundation.

2000 
“TANG CHANG THE ORIGINAL, THE ORIGINAL TANG CHANG!”
 Artist’s Collection of 400 Selected Self-Portraits (1954 – 1987)
  21 March – 9 April 2000 at The Mercury Art Gallery, Plernchit, Bangkok.

2001 
“The Artist is chasing, chasing, chasing,
Chasing, chasing, chasing, chasing after,
Chasing, chasing, chasing, keep on chasing,
Chasing, chasing, chasing, and chasing,
To seize the sun light for his painting.”
25 June  – 22 July 2001 at Open Arts Space, The Silom Galleria.

2002 
TANG CHANG “A MOMENT IN A LONG, PRODUCTIVE AND CREATIVE LIFE!”
An overview of his lifetime Works is composed of 3 dimensions of his creative endeavours, reflecting his critical views of world.
The Artist’s Collection of Paintings (1954 -1990)
The Artist’s Collection of Literary Works (1960-1990)
The Artist’s Collection of  Living Words of Wisdom (1967 -1990)
17 – 30 September 2002 at Marsi Gallery, Suan Pakkad Palace Museum, Bangkok.
1 – 14 October 2002 at 14 October 73 Memorial, Ratchadamnoen Avenue, Bangkok
11 – 26 October 2002 at Pridi Banomyong Institute, Sukhumvit 55, Bangkok.
TRAVELLING EXHIBITS
All the above 3 sets of exhibited Works (67 pieces) will be exhibited as the followings:
1st  – 15 November 2002 at Art and Culture Gallery, Naresuan University, Phitsanulok.
20 November – 3 December 2002 at Khon Kaen University, Khon Kaen.
9th  -23 December 2002 at Ubon Vocational College, Ubon Ratchathani

2007 
World View from Within : Tang Chang, Tang Chang’s Private Collection 1958 – 1982, Chamchuri Art Gallery, Chulalongkorn University, Bangkok

2008  
Local Museum Festival, 2nd  – 4 November  at Princess Maha Chaki Sirindhorn Anthropology Centre (Public Organisation), Bangkok

2013 
Tang Chang : “It was my desire to have my very own space” Tang Chang’s special collection, Drawings, Concrete Poetry and Poems, 5 February – 31 March at Subhashok The Arts Centre (S.A.C.), Sukhumvit 33, Bangkok.
“Tang Chang: Abstract Paintings – Concrete Poetry”, Tang Chang’s special collection, Paintings and Concrete Poetry, 15 February – 28 April at G23 Srinakharinwirot University, Sukhumvit 23, Bangkok.

2014 
Invited to participate in International Contemporary Art Festival “Shanghai Biennale X” on 23 November 2014 – 31 March 2015 at Power Station of Art, Shanghai, People's Republic of China (PRC).

Social Contribution

1960 
Portraiture, publicly executed portraits (charcoal), benefit given to the Red Cross Society of Thailand, Bangkok.

1961 
Portraiture, publicly executed portraits (charcoal), a charity act at the fund-raising activity of the Red Cross Society of Thailand.
Pioneered the “White on White” technique, for abstract paintings.

1962 
“Fingers Painting”, Tang Chang"s own technique employed for the execution of a series of 12 large scaled oil paintings on “ The Bhodhisatava”, currently a permanent collection of the Tian Hua Hospital Foundation, Samyak Area of China Town, Bangkok.
Portraiture, benefit work (charcoal) donated to assist a fund-raising drive launched by the Red Cross Society of Bangkok.
Pioneered the “Black on Black” technique, as a form of abstract expression.

1971 
Tang Chang – Representing Thailand, by virtue of his literary accomplishment, invited to participate in the Congress of Orientalists, 1971, Canberra, Australia.
Invited guest lecturer, a development course attended by Buddhist Monks and Students Development Unit, Jittaphawan Buddhist College, Bang-Lamung district, Cholburi province.
The Association of Thai Students in Canberra requested permission to publish Tang Chang"s Avand Guard literary works in their publication, and for wider dissemination in Australia. Permission granted.
“Look East” magazine published Tang Chang"s concrete poetry, and his paintings, making his works better known around the world.

Literary Works 
”Black Cover”, a collection of original concrete poetry, published in 1968.
”Concrete Poetry”, an English version of the “Black Cover”, also published in 1968.
”That Child”, poetry published in 1969.
”Tao-Chi: The Great Philosopher of Art”, translation work and article written on the great Chinese thinker, published in 1967.
”Tao Tih Ching by Lao Tsu”, translation, elaboration, and selected articles written on the subject, published in 1972.
”Orange Colour”, Poetry, published 1973.
”Mother & Child”, Poetry, published in 1972.
”Past Images”, Poetry, published in 1974.
”Chinese Poetry”, translation of selected Chinese poetry, published in 1974.
”Ah Q by Lu Zun”, translated from the original Chinese version into Thai, published in 1975.
”The Dawn”, poetry, published in 1985.
”Wide Open Sky”, poetry, published in 1986.
”New Day”, a collection of poetry and short stories, published in 1986.
”That Child II”, poetry, published in 1987.
”An Art Diary”, a collection of poetry and drawings/paintings, published in 1987.
”The Universal Truth of Taoism by Lao Tsu”, translation, elaboration, and articles written on the subject, including some selection of drawings/paintings, published in 1987.
”A Tranquil Garden”, poetry.
”Tranquillity”, poetry.
”Kathakodha, the one who spreads the words of Dharma”, poetry.
”The Dharma Poetry”.
”Concrete Poetry”.
”Short Stories”.
”Article on Art”, own writing.
”Article on Art”, translated work.
”Article on Literary Works”, own writing.
”Article on Chinese History and Ancient Chinese Philosophies”, translated work.
”Taoism for M.S.5 Levels (Secondary School)”, translated into simplified form, with some elaboration, and selected articles on the subject.
”Zun Wu – The Art of War”, translated work, 
”Han Sun”s Poetry”, translated work. Printed in 2010
”Past Images II”, poetry.
”Wei Lang”, translation with some elaboration.
”Juang Jeh”, translation with some elaboration.
”The Three People”s Principles” based on Dr. Sun Yat Sen" historic speech, translation and elaboration.
”Poems for Father, Mother & Children”, poetry.
”Poems on Society and Community”, poetry.
 "My Poetries"Some suggestions and explanations on my approach to poetry, poetry and articles on the subject, Printed in 2010

International Exhibition 
 Shanghai Biennale, China (2014)
 The World is our Home, Hong Kong (2015)
 Reframing Modernism, Singapore (2016)
 Misfits : Pages from loose-leaf modernity, Germany (2017)
 Tang Chang : The Painting That is Painted With Poetry is Beautiful, Chicago, USA (2018)

References 

Tang Chang
Tang Chang
Tang Chang
1934 births
1990 deaths
20th-century poets
20th-century painters
Tang Chang